Murad Sattarli (born on 9 May 1992) is an Azerbaijani football offensive midfielder.

Career

Club
In January 2014, Sattarli moved from Qarabağ to Simurq on a six-month contract. A year later, January 2015, Sattarli left Simurq by mutual consent.

On 17 June 2016, Sattarli signed a two-year contract with Zira.

On 25 December 2017, Sattarli signed one-year contract with Kapaz.

International
On 26 May 2016 Sattarli made his senior international debut for Azerbaijan friendly match against Andorra.

Career statistics

Club

International

Statistics accurate as of match played 26 May 2016

References

External links
 

1992 births
Living people
Association football midfielders
Azerbaijani footballers
Azerbaijan international footballers
Azerbaijan youth international footballers
Azerbaijani expatriate footballers
Azerbaijan Premier League players
Qarabağ FK players
MOIK Baku players
Sumgayit FK players
Simurq PIK players
AZAL PFK players
Zira FK players
Kapaz PFK players